Fox High School is a public high school located in Arnold, Missouri that is part of the Fox School District. Approximately 2,000 students are currently enrolled. The school is named for Charles Fox, who once owned the land where the campus was built.

Notable events
On October 24, 1988, Republican vice-presidential candidate Dan Quayle addressed the students at Fox High School, listening to questions and discussing the war on drugs.

On July 17, 1993, President Bill Clinton with several members of his cabinet held a "flood summit" at the school during the Great Flood of 1993. During the summit, Clinton promised the governors of flood-damaged states that his administration would not abandon them once the water recedes.

On April 29, 2009, President Barack Obama held a town hall meeting in the auditorium of the school to mark the 100th day of his administration.

Activities
The school officially sponsors several athletic programs, including soccer, cheerleading, men's football (2008 and 2009 Division 6A semi-finalists and quarterfinalists, respectively), volleyball (2008 men's conference tournament semifinalists), track & field, cross country, basketball, wrestling, baseball, softball, and golf.  Fox High School is also associated with several private club teams, including men's rugby, hockey, and men's lacrosse (2008 Division 2 State Champions).  Fox has several award-winning arts programs, including its marching band, who won 1st overall at the 2017 and 2018 Vallhala Marching Festival. The school boasts broad involvement in numerous other student organizations, including a strong FBLA chapter.

Notable alumni
Dana Loesch, national spokesperson for the National Rifle Association; talk-show host
Kenny Wallace, NASCAR driver
Mike Wells, NFL Player, 1994-2001

References

High schools in Jefferson County, Missouri
Public high schools in Missouri